Karla Camila Cabello Estrabao (born March 3, 1997) is a Cuban-born American singer and songwriter. She rose to prominence as a member of the girl group Fifth Harmony, which became one of the best-selling girl groups of all time. While in Fifth Harmony, Cabello began to establish herself as a solo artist with the release of the collaborations "I Know What You Did Last Summer" with Shawn Mendes and "Bad Things" with Machine Gun Kelly, the latter reaching number four on the US Billboard Hot 100. She left the group in late 2016.

Her debut studio album, Camila (2018), reached number one on the US Billboard 200. The Latin music–influenced pop album was critically well-received and earned a Platinum certification from the RIAA. Its lead single "Havana" topped the charts in several countries, including Australia, the US and UK, and the follow-up single "Never Be the Same" reached the top ten in multiple countries. Cabello's 2019 duet with Mendes, "Señorita", became her second single to top the Billboard Hot 100. Her second studio album, Romance (2019), peaked at number 3 on the Billboard 200 chart, with the single "My Oh My" peaking at number 12 on the Hot 100, and inside the top ten in multiple countries.

In 2021, Cabello made her acting debut, starring as the title character from the film Cinderella. Cabello released her third studio album Familia in April 2022, with the lead single "Don't Go Yet" released in July 2021. The second single from Familia, "Bam Bam", reached the top five of the Billboard Global 200 Chart, Cabello's highest entry and peaked inside the top ten in several countries, it also peaked at 21 on the Billboard Hot 100. Familia peaked at number 10 on the Billboard 200, number 9 in the UK and number 6 in Canada.

Cabello has amassed billions of streams on music platforms, and "Havana" became the best-selling digital single of 2018, according to the International Federation of the Phonographic Industry (IFPI). Cabello's many awards include two Latin Grammy Awards, five American Music Awards, and one Billboard Music Award. In 2021, "Havana" was certified Diamond by the RIAA, making Cabello the first Hispanic woman to receive this certification.

Early life and education 
Cabello was born in the Habana del Este district of Cojímar in Havana, Cuba, to Alejandro Cabello and Sinuhe Estrabao. Her father was born in Mexico City and is a Mexican who moved to Cuba. She has a younger sister named Sofia. For most of her early life, Cabello and her family moved back and forth between Havana and Mexico City. 

When Cabello was six years old, she relocated to Miami, Florida with her mother by crossing the border from Mexico to the United States and taking a 36 hour long Greyhound bus ride to Miami after waiting only a day at the border before being granted permission to enter the US. Cabello was told by her mother that she was going to Disneyworld as an incentive to go to the US; they moved into Cabello’s grandfather’s colleague’s house who later became her godmother. Cabello’s mother took night courses to learn English. Cabello’s father was unable to obtain a visa at the time and joined the family approximately 18 months later where he would first work washing cars in front of Dolphin Mall. Cabello’s mother who was an architect with a degree in Cuba worked at Marshalls stacking shoes in the US before two other Cuban women approached her at work and told her that they had a brother who worked in architecture and needed someone who worked in AutoCAD; Cabello’s mother learned the program in a week and later earned enough money to move into an apartment with Cabello. Cabello’s mother and father eventually formed a construction company named after her and her sister. Cabello acquired American citizenship in 2008.

She attended Miami Palmetto High School but left during the 2012–2013 school year while she was in 9th grade to pursue her singing career. Later she earned her high school diploma.

Career

2012–2016: The X Factor and Fifth Harmony

Camila Cabello auditioned for the TV talent competition show The X Factor in Greensboro, North Carolina, with Aretha Franklin's "Respect"; however, her audition was not aired because the series did not get the rights for the song. After elimination during the "bootcamp" portion of the process in Miami, Florida, Cabello was called back to the stage along with other contestants Ally Brooke, Normani, Lauren Jauregui, and Dinah Jane to form the girl group that would later become known as Fifth Harmony. After finishing in third place on the show, they signed a joint deal with Syco Music, owned by Simon Cowell, and Epic Records, L.A. Reid's record label.

The group released the EP Better Together (2013) along with the studio albums Reflection (2015) and 7/27 (2016). The latter two generated the singles "Worth It" and "Work from Home", respectively, which reached the top 10 in several international charts. From 2013 through the end of 2016, Cabello performed in various tours with Fifth Harmony.
In November 2015, Cabello collaborated with Canadian singer Shawn Mendes on a duet titled "I Know What You Did Last Summer", a song they wrote together. The single charted at number 20 in the US and 18 in Canada and was certified platinum by the Recording Industry Association of America (RIAA). On October 14, 2016, American rapper Machine Gun Kelly released a joint single with Cabello called "Bad Things", which reached a peak of number four on the US Billboard Hot 100 songs chart. Also that year, Time magazine included Cabello on "The 25 Most Influential Teens of 2016" list.

On December 18, 2016, Fifth Harmony announced Cabello's departure, with both sides giving contradictory explanations of the circumstances for her exit. She appeared in a previously taped performance with the group on Dick Clark's New Year's Rockin' Eve at the end of 2016. Writing about Cabello's time in the group, a Billboard journalist noted it is "rather uncommon for someone to stand out in a collective as much as Cabello has over the past years."

2017–2018: Breakthrough with Camila

On January 25, 2017, "Love Incredible", a collaboration with Norwegian DJ Cashmere Cat, leaked online. The official version of the song was released on February 16 and later featured on Cashmere's debut studio album, 9 (2017). Cabello also recorded "Hey Ma" with rappers Pitbull and J Balvin for The Fate of the Furious soundtrack (2017). The Spanish version of the single and its music video were released on March 10, 2017, and the English version was released on April 6. The singer was also featured on a collaboration with Major Lazer, Travis Scott and Quavo for the song "Know No Better".

In May 2017, Cabello announced the future release of her first studio album, at the time titled The Hurting. The Healing. The Loving., which she described as "the story of my journey from darkness into light, from a time when I was lost to a time when I found myself again". Her debut solo single "Crying in the Club" was released on May 19, 2017, followed by a performance at the 2017 Billboard Music Awards. The single peaked at number 47 in the United States. She joined Bruno Mars' 24K Magic World Tour as an opening act for several shows in 2017 and partnered with clothing brand Guess as the face of their 2017 Fall campaign.

New writing and recording sessions for her album, influenced by the success of her single "Havana" featuring Young Thug, postponed the album's original release date. The single reached number one in Australia, Canada, the United Kingdom, Ireland, France, Hungary and the United States. It also spent seven weeks atop the US Mainstream Top 40 airplay chart. The song became Spotify's most-streamed song ever by a solo female artist in June 2018, with over 888 million streams at the time. Titled Camila, her debut album is a pop record containing Latin-influenced songs and ballads. Camila was released on January 12, 2018, and debuted at number one in the United States with 119,000 album-equivalent units, including 65,000 from pure album sales. The album was eventually certified platinum in the country. "Real Friends" and "Never Be the Same" were released in the same day on December 7, 2017, the latter becoming her third top 10 entry on the Hot 100, peaking at Number 6. "Havana" and "Never Be the Same" made Cabello the first artist to top the Mainstream Top 40 and Adult Top 40 airplay charts with the first two singles from a debut studio album. She later won an MTV Video Music Award for Video of the Year for "Havana".

In April 2018, Cabello embarked on the Never Be the Same Tour, her first headlining concert tour as a solo artist. She was featured in "Sangria Wine", a song she recorded with Pharrell Williams. Cabello released the song live during the tour. In May 2018, Cabello made a cameo appearance in Maroon 5's music video for "Girls Like You". In the same month, she began performing as the opening act for American singer-songwriter Taylor Swift in her Reputation Stadium Tour in between the European leg of the Never Be the Same Tour. She headlined an arena for the first time on July 31, 2018, at the Mohegan Sun Arena in Uncasville, Connecticut. Cabello was featured in the remix version of "Beautiful", a song from American singer Bazzi. The remix was released on August 2. On October 9, 2018, Cabello released the video single "Consequences", having first surprised 12 of her biggest fans in advance with a "Most Amazing Mystery Gift & Personal Letter".

In December 2018, she was nominated for two Grammys: Best Pop Solo Performance for a live version of "Havana" and Best Pop Vocal Album for Camila. Her performance of "Havana" with guests Ricky Martin, J Balvin and Young Thug at the start of the ceremony made her the first female Latin artist to open the show.

2019–2020: Romance 
In October 2018, Cabello announced she would start working on new music in the new year after the holidays. In April 2019, it was announced that Cabello would star in an upcoming film adaptation of Cinderella, directed by Kay Cannon for Sony Pictures.

On June 21, 2019, Cabello released "Señorita" with Canadian singer Shawn Mendes, along with the music video. The song debuted at number two on the US Billboard Hot 100 chart and marked Mendes' and Cabello's second collaboration, following "I Know What You Did Last Summer" (2015). In August, "Señorita" climbed to the number one position on the Hot 100, making it Cabello's second single to top the chart. "Señorita" reached Number 1 in over 30 countries. It earned a nomination for the Grammy Award for Best Pop Duo/Group Performance. According to the IFPI, "Señorita" was the third best-selling song of 2019 globally and is currently the 9th most streamed song on Spotify, as of November 2021. She also recorded the song "South of the Border" with British singer-songwriter Ed Sheeran and American rapper Cardi B, which was released in July 2019 and reached Number 4 on the UK Singles Chart.

On September 1, 2019, Cabello posted a clip on Instagram, teasing the release of her second studio album Romance. Two days later, she announced the first two singles from the album, "Liar" and "Shameless", which were released on September 5, followed by "Cry for Me" and "Easy" in October 2019. Romance was released on December 6, 2019, and was supposed to be supported by the Romance Tour in 2020, until its cancelation due to the COVID-19 pandemic. "Living Proof" was released with the pre-orders of the album on November 15, 2019. Romance debuted and peaked at Number 3 on the US Billboard 200 and reached Number 1 in Canada. It also reached the top 10 in 12 countries, including Australia, New Zealand and Spain. "My Oh My" featuring DaBaby entered the top 20 on the Billboard Hot 100, peaking at Number 12; it also peaked at Number 1 on US Mainstream Top 40.

In mid-March 2020, Cabello participated in iHeart Media's Living Room Concert for America, a benefit to raise awareness and funds for the COVID-19 pandemic.

2021–present: Cinderella, Familia and The Voice
On July 23, 2021, Cabello released "Don't Go Yet" as the lead single from her third studio album Familia, announced alongside the release of the single. On October 15, 2021, Cabello premiered "La Buena Vida", from Familia, during her NPR Tiny Desk Concert. On October 29, 2021, Cabello released "Oh Na Na" with Myke Towers and Tainy, though it is not included on the album. Familia was named by Forbes one of the most anticipated pop albums of 2022. It was confirmed on March 3, 2022, that Familia would be released on April 8, 2022 and is 12 tracks long.

In early September, Cabello performed "Don't Go Yet" at the BCC Live Lounge. She also performed a cover of Olivia Rodrigo's "Good 4 U", which later won the iHeartRadio Music Award for Best Cover Performance.

In the latter half of 2021, Cabello appeared in an adaptation of Cinderella, which was released in select theatres and digitally on Amazon Prime Video on September 3, 2021. Cinderella was the most-watched streaming movie over the Labour Day weekend, as well as the most-watched movie musical yet in 2021. The film received mixed reviews from critics, though Cabello's performance received favourable reviews. Richard Roeper of the Chicago Sun-Times gave the film 3 out of 4 stars and praised Cabello for her performance, saying "she has a real knack for comedy", and IndieWire remarked, "In her cinematic debut, the pop star stitches up a charming performance in an oft-told fairy tale." In an interview with The One Show in July, Cabello said she would like to continue acting.

In November 2021, Cabello released an Amazon Exclusive of the Bing Crosby song "I'll Be Home for Christmas". It reached Number 2 on the Billboard Bubbling Under Hot 100, before peaking at Number 71 on the Billboard Hot 100. It is the highest charting cover version of the song to date on the Hot 100. It also peaked at Number 58 on the Billboard Holiday 100 and Number 24 on the UK Singles Chart, marking Cabello's 13th Top 40 hit in the UK. Cabello performed the single at the Michael Bublé's Christmas in the City special on NBC and for PBS' In Performance at The White House: Spirit of the Season. In November 2022, Cabello's "I'll Be Home for Christmas" was released on all streaming platforms. 

On December 6, 2021, it was announced that Cabello would open for Coldplay during the Latin American leg of their Music of the Spheres World Tour in September 2022. She opened for them in Colombia, Peru and Chile, with additional dates added. She also performed at Rock in Rio that same month.

On February 21, 2022, Cabello announced that her collaboration with Ed Sheeran titled "Bam Bam" would arrive on March 4, 2022. The song was released that day, with a music video accompanying. Cabello debuted the song with a performance on The Late Late Show with James Corden on the day of release. Cabello and Sheeran performed "Bam Bam" together for the first time live at the Concert For Ukraine benefit at Resorts World Arena in Birmingham. "Bam Bam" peaked at number 5 on the Billboard Global 200 chart, marking Cabello's highest peak since the charts creation in 2020. It also peaked at 21 on the Billboard Hot 100, and inside the top 10 in Canada and the UK. "Bam Bam" earned a nomination for the Grammy Award for Best Pop Duo/Group Performance.

On April 8, 2022, Familia was released and accompanied by a virtual TikTok concert 'immersive performance' titled "Familia: Welcome to the Family". Familia was met with positive reviews from critics, with NME, The Guardian and Rolling Stone all giving it 4/5 stars. Reviewing positively for NME, Nick Levine called the album "[Cabello's] richest and most compelling album yet," having delved into her heritage and psyche. In a similar review, Rolling Stone critic Tomás Mier wrote that the album is "an imperfect yet revealing mosaic of Cabello's Cuban-Mexican heritage." While noting the multiple changes in style as quite disorienting, Mier complimented the album's raw and honest lyrics, comparing it to reading Cabello's diary. In a review for The Guardian, Alim Kheraj praised the album's vibrant Latin motifs—"honest and humming with artistic intent"—and noted the recurring theme of "self-sabotage and paranoia."

Familia debuted at number 10 on the US Billboard 200, marking Cabello's 3rd Top ten album. It also debuted at number six in Canada, number nine in the UK and number four in Spain, the latter marking Cabello's 2nd highest debut there.

On May 9, 2022, it was announced Cabello would headline the UEFA Champions League Final on May 28. On May 28, 2022, Cabello performed "Señorita", "Havana", "Bam Bam" and "Don't Go Yet" during the UEFA Champions League Final opening ceremony. The performance is the most viewed video on UEFA's channel. Cabello released 'Road to the UEFA Champion's League Final', a Behind the Scenes look at preparing for the performance on her YouTube channel.

On May 15, 2022, Cabello announced via her TikTok account that she would be a coach on the US version of The Voice for its twenty-second season replacing Kelly Clarkson. In October 2022, it was confirmed that Cabello would not return for the twenty-third season.

On July 27, 2022 Stromae released a remix of his song "Mon amour" starring Cabello, with an accompanying music video that is a play on shows like Love Island. Cabello provided a verse she recorded in LA and sang in French for the song. In September 2022, Cabello released a collaboration with Camilo,"Ambulancia" is on Camilo's new album De adentro pa afuera. In December 2022, Cabello released her third non-album collaboration of 2022, a remix of "KU LO SA" by Oxlade. 

In September 2022, Cabello departed Epic Records and signed to Interscope Records, a label of Universal Music Group.

Artistry
Primarily a R&B and pop singer, Cabello possesses a soprano vocal range. She grew up listening to artists such as Alejandro Fernández and Celia Cruz. Her debut studio album is a pop record, influenced by Latin music. The album incorporates elements of reggaeton, hip hop, and dancehall and took inspiration from contemporary Latin artists such as Calle 13 and J Balvin, as well as from the songwriting of Taylor Swift and Ed Sheeran. Her sophomore album was inspired by the "big sounds" of the 80s and Queen. She has also cited Michael Jackson, Rihanna, Shakira, Alejandro Sanz, David Bisbal, Alejandro Fernández, Maná, Beyoncé, John Mayer, Demi Lovato and Eminem as influences.

Philanthropy
In February 2016, Cabello announced she had partnered with Save the Children to design a limited-edition "Love Only" T-shirt to help raise awareness of issues involving girls' equal access to education, health care and opportunities to succeed. In June 2016, Cabello, producer Benny Blanco, and members of the nonprofit arts organization OMG Everywhere helped to create the charity single "Power in Me". Cabello has also partnered with the Children's Health Fund, a non-profit dedicated to providing health care to low-income families with children.

On April 3, 2017, Cabello performed at Zedd's WELCOME! Fundraising Concert, which raised money for ACLU. Cabello sang to patients at UCLA Mattel Children's Hospital on May 8, 2017. In late 2017, she joined Lin-Manuel Miranda and multiple other Latin artists on the song "Almost Like Praying" for Puerto Rico hurricane relief. Cabello also announced she was donating all proceeds of "Havana" to the ACLU for DREAMers.

Cabello donated portions of proceeds from VIP sale packages to the Children's Health Fund while on the 2018 Never Be the Same tour. On July 13, 2018, she performed a concert in San Juan and donated a portion of the concert's proceeds to Hurricane Maria Relief Fund. In November 2018, Cabello became an ambassador for Save the Children.

In March 2019, Cabello announced she donated $10,000 to a GoFundMe campaign for a homeless immigrant. In September 2019, Cabello pledged to raise $250,000 for Save the Children organization. In October 2019, Cabello performed at the We Can Survive concert which donates to breast cancer. On October 22, 2019, Cabello appeared with the Duke and Duchess of Cambridge at Kensington Palace in support of the finalists for the BBC Radio 1 Teen Heroes Awards.

In March 2020, Cabello participated in iHeart Media's Living Room Concert for America, a benefit to raise awareness and funds for the COVID-19 pandemic. In March and April 2020, Cabello participated in Global Citizen Festival's Together at Home virtual concert to raise awareness and funds for the COVID-19 pandemic. In May 2020, Cabello, alongside Shawn Mendes, joined protests in Miami for racial justice after the murder of George Floyd. In July 2021, she expressed support for the 2021 Cuban protests against the country's government.

In January 2021, Cabello partnered with the nonprofit Movement Voter Fund to launch The Healing Justice project, a project to identify ten organizations to receive grants to pay for mental health resources for their frontline workers. Cabello pledged the seed money for the venture, $250,000, and has pledged to continue to support the project going forward. So far the project has given grants to several organisations, including Muslim Woman For, Freedom Inc and QLatinx.

Cabello is an outspoken advocate for climate change and regularly speaks about this on her social media and in interviews. In September 2021 Cabello recruited over 60 artists to sign an open letter to several entertainment companies including Amazon, Facebook and Apple, calling on them to ask Congress to pass the climate action that President Biden called for in his Build Back Better agenda.

In March 2022, Cabello performed at the Concert for Ukraine benefit concert. The two-hour benefit show was put on to raise money for the Disasters Emergency Committee's (DEC) Ukraine Humanitarian Appeal following the Russian invasion of Ukraine. Cabello performed a cover of "Fix You" by Coldplay and her single "Bam Bam", with Ed Sheeran joining her on stage for their first live performance of the song together.

In May 2022, Cabello launched and hosted a benefit concert to support the emergency "Protect Our Kids" fund. The singer has teamed with Lambda Legal and Equality Florida to help protect LGBTQ+ students and their families from Florida's so-called "Don't Say Gay or Trans" bill.

As part of her collaboration with Pepsi for UEFA Champions League, Cabello is among music and football talent that will be supporting #Football4Refugees, an appeal launched by UNHCR, the UN Refugee Agency, to unite the global football community to raise funds for displaced people around the world.

On August 22, 2022, Cabello announced that she had provided vocals and written a song with Hans Zimmer for the documentary series Frozen Planet 2. Cabello called this an 'honour' and the song debuted on August 28, 2022, incorporated in the first trailer for the show. It won the award for Best Song/Score in a Trailer at the 2022 Hollywood Music in Media Awards.

Awards and nominations

Among her awards, Cabello has won two Latin Grammy Awards, four American Music Awards, a Billboard Music Award, five MTV Europe Music Awards, two iHeartRadio Music Awards, four MTV Video Music Awards (including one for Video of the Year), three iHeartRadio Much Music Video Awards, and a Billboard Women in Music award for Breakthrough Artist.

Personal life
Cabello was in a relationship with dating coach and writer Matthew Hussey, whom she met on the set of The Today Show. They dated from February 2018 to June 2019.

She began dating Canadian singer Shawn Mendes in July 2019. The relationship caused controversy, as both were accused of attempting to form a relationship for publicity, but Mendes insisted it was "definitely not a publicity stunt". The relationship was confirmed after the release of their song "Señorita". In November 2021, Cabello and Mendes announced their breakup.

In August 2022, Cabello began dating Lox CEO Austin Kevitch, whom she met through their mutual friend Nicholas Galitzine, Cabello's co-lead in Cinderella. In February 2023, it was announced the two had broken up. 

Cabello has anxiety and obsessive–compulsive disorder. Cabello has spoken openly about engaging with therapy and the importance of looking after one's mental health and well-being.

Cabello purchased a  home in the Hollywood Hills neighborhood of Los Angeles in 2019. In December 2021, it was reported that she sold the home for $4.3 million.

In December 2019, Tumblr posts that Cabello had reblogged between 2012 and 2013 surfaced on Twitter, containing racial slurs and derogatory language, including uses of the slur "nigger" and mocking Chris Brown's 2009 assault on Rihanna. Her Tumblr account was deleted soon afterward and Cabello issued an apology, stating that she was "uneducated and ignorant" when younger and that she was deeply embarrassed to have ever used "horrible and hurtful" language. She added that "those mistakes don't represent" her and that she "only [stands] and [has] ever stood for love and inclusivity." In March 2021, Cabello said she had taken part in weekly racial healing sessions administered by the racial equity group National Compadres Network, in which "you get corrected, you have homework, and you learn … Now I know better so I can do better."

Discography

 Camila (2018)
 Romance (2019)
 Familia (2022)

Tours

Headlining
Never Be the Same Tour (2018-2019)

Opening acts
 Bruno Mars – 24K Magic World Tour (2017)
 Taylor Swift – Reputation Stadium Tour (2018)
 Coldplay – Music of the Spheres World Tour (2022)

Cancelled
 The Romance Tour (2020)

Filmography

Film

Television

Web

References

External links

 
 

 
1997 births
21st-century American women singers
21st-century American singers
Actresses from Havana
American contemporary R&B singers
American women pop singers
American people of Cuban descent
American people of Mexican descent
American women songwriters
Cuban emigrants to the United States
Fifth Harmony members
Hispanic and Latino American actresses
Hispanic and Latino American women singers
Latin Grammy Award winners
Living people
Miami Palmetto Senior High School alumni
Musicians from Miami
People with acquired American citizenship
Spanish-language singers of the United States
The X Factor (American TV series) contestants
People with obsessive–compulsive disorder
Judges in American reality television series